Jalipudi is a village in Eluru district of the Indian state of Andhra Pradesh. It is located in Eluru mandal of Eluru revenue division. The town is a constituent of Eluru urban agglomeration.

Demographics 

 Census of India, Jalipudi had a population of 3818. The total population constitute, 1880 males and 1938 females with a sex ratio of 1031 females per 1000 males. 400 children are in the age group of 0–6 years with child sex ratio of 1062 girls per 1000 boys. The average literacy rate stands at 73.34 %

Transport

Jalipudi is well connected by road. For this village till date there is no bus facility from APSRTC.

References

External links

Villages in Eluru district